Peripterygia marginata is a species of shrubs in the family Celastraceae. It is endemic to New Caledonia and the only species of the genus Peripterygia. Its closest relatives are Crossopetalum and Siphonodon.

References

Endemic flora of New Caledonia
Celastrales genera
Monotypic rosid genera
Celastraceae
Taxa named by Henri Ernest Baillon
Taxa named by Ludwig Eduard Theodor Loesener